Shara Hughes (born 1981) is an American painter.

Biography
Hughes was born in 1981 in Atlanta, Georgia. She attended the Rhode Island School of Design (RISD) and went on to study at the Skowhegan School of Painting and Sculpture. She lives and works in Brooklyn.

Exhibitions and collections
In 2017 an entire room Hughes' work was in the 2017 Whitney Biennial.

Her work is included in the collections of the Whitney Museum of American Art, the Metropolitan Museum of Art and the Museum of Contemporary Art, Georgia as well as the Denver Art Museum, and the Smithsonian American Art Museum.

Hughes had a solo exhibit at Switzerland’s Kunstmuseum Luzern in the fall of 2022.

References

External links
images of Hughes' paintings on ArtNet
video: Shara Hughes Interview: Changing the Way We See

1981 births
20th-century American painters
Living people
21st-century American women artists
21st-century American painters
People from Atlanta
20th-century American women
Rhode Island School of Design alumni
Skowhegan School of Painting and Sculpture alumni